Minna Sundberg (born January 9, 1990) is a Swedish-speaking Finnish illustrator and cartoonist born in Sweden. She is known for the webcomics A Redtail's Dream (aRTD), and Stand Still, Stay Silent (SS, SS).

Biography 
Minna Sundberg was born in Sweden in 1990 into a family of Swedish-speaking Finns which returned to Finland in 1997. She obtained a bachelor's degree from the University of Art and Design Helsinki, Finland, Graphic Design department. At age 25, and as the first Finn, she won a Reuben Award in the category Online Comics – Long Form

Career 
During her first year in university, planning to make a career as a webcomic artist, she made several attempts to start a "practice comic", the last of which evolved into A Redtail's Dream (aRTD). A Redtail's Dream became a 556-page tale built around concepts from Finnish mythology. Her following project was Stand Still, Stay Silent about an imaginary post-apocalyptic world set 90 years into the future. The supplementary info page on "Language Families" from Stand Still, Stay Silent showing Indo-European and Uralic families was published as a poster and gained popularity outside of comics fandom, earning praise by linguists. While living in Mora in 2013 and 2014, she ran two Indiegogo crowdfunding campaigns successfully  to finance publishing her comics in print. Sundberg's work was cited as a representative example of the maturing genre of webcomics, while her style was called "perfectly assured" and "awe-inspiring". She also worked as illustrator, including cover art, for several publications.

In March 2021, Sundberg released a short comic called Lovely People, about bunnies living in a social credit system, and revealed that she had converted to Christianity. On March 28, 2022, the last page of Stand Still, Stay Silent was released, ending the webcomic. On October 31, 2022, she published A Meandering Line, a short comic detailing her conversion to Christianity.

Religion 
In A Meandering Line, Sundberg writes that she is a Calvinist and was interested in monergistic churches (such as Reformed Baptist, Presbyterian and Lutheran) shortly after her conversion to Christianity. She ended up joining a Reformed Baptist church in Finland.

Selected works 
Sundberg, Minna: A Redtail's Dream, s. 608. Author's Edition, 2014. 
Sundberg, Minna: Stand Still Stay Silent Book 1, s. 324. Author's Edition, 2015. ISSN 2342-8880 (print) ISSN 2342-8899 (online).
Sundberg, Minna: Stand Still Stay Silent Book 2, s. 260. Hiveworks Comics, 2018. 
Sundberg, Minna: Stand Still Stay Silent Book 3, s. 304. Hiveworks Comics, 2020. ISSN 2342-8880 (printed book), ISSN 2342-8899 (online).
Sundberg, Minna: Un Réve de Renard, s. 600. Édition Akileos, 2019. 
Sundberg, Minna: Stand Still Stay Silent Livre 1, s. 328. Édition Akileos, 2018. 
Sundberg, Minna: Stand Still Stay Silent Livre 2, s. 260. Édition Akileos, 2019. 
Sundberg, Minna: Stand Still Stay Silent Livre 3. s. 304. Édition Akileos, 2020. 
Sundberg, Minna: Lovely People, s. 80. Author's Edition, 2021. 
Illustrations for Dragon Art. Inspiration, Impact & Technique in Fantasy Art (2009) 
Cover art for Foxhunt (2009) 
Cover art for Syvyyksien valtias Original title Storlax The power of the deep (2010)  
Cover art for Crossed Genres Quarterly 4 (2011) 
CD cover art for music band The Winter Tree (2011)
Cover art for Legazy (2013) 
Cover art for Australian series of children fantasy Zarkora books. (2015)

Awards 
2015 Reuben Award by the National Cartoonists Society in the category of 'Online Comics – Long Form' for Stand Still. Stay Silent.

References

External links 
Official website "Webcomics by Minna Sundberg"

1990 births
Living people
21st-century Swedish women artists
21st-century Finnish women artists
Finnish people of Swedish descent
Swedish-speaking Finns
Finnish cartoonists
Finnish comics artists
Finnish webcomic creators
Swedish cartoonists
Swedish women cartoonists
Swedish comics artists
Swedish illustrators
Finnish graphic novelists
Aalto University alumni
Finnish women illustrators
Swedish women illustrators
Swedish female comics artists
Finnish female comics artists
Female comics writers